Labidochromis heterodon is a species of cichlid endemic to Lake Malawi where it is only known to occur around Boadzulu Island.  This species can reach a length of  SL.  It can also be found in the aquarium trade.

References

heterodon
Fish described in 1982
Fish of Lake Malawi
Cichlid fish of Africa
Taxonomy articles created by Polbot